The S&P 500 stock market index is maintained by S&P Dow Jones Indices. It comprises 503 common stocks which are issued by 500 large-cap companies traded on American stock exchanges (including the 30 companies that compose the Dow Jones Industrial Average). The index includes about 80 percent of the American equity market by capitalization. It is weighted by free-float market capitalization, so more valuable companies account for relatively more weight in the index. The index constituents and the constituent weights are updated regularly using rules published by S&P Dow Jones Indices. Although called the S&P 500, the index contains 503 stocks because it includes two share classes of stock from 3 of its component companies.

S&P 500 component stocks

Selected changes to the list of S&P 500 components

S&P Dow Jones Indices updates the components of the S&P 500 periodically, typically in response to acquisitions, or to keep the index up to date as various companies grow or shrink in value. Between January 1, 1963, and December 31, 2014, 1,186 index components were replaced by other components.

See also

 Dow Jones Industrial Average#Components
 NASDAQ-100#Components
 List of S&P 400 companies

References

External links
 Standard & Poor's page on S&P 500 index

S&P Dow Jones Indices
SandP 500 companies